The Master System—renamed and with a redesigned casing from the original Sega Mark III, which had been released in the Japanese market in 1985—is a video game console released by Sega in the North American market in June 1986 to compete with the Nintendo Entertainment System, which had been released in the same market in February 1986 (an earlier test market for NES in New York and California occurred in October 1985). Originally priced at 200, North American distribution rights for the console were acquired by Tonka before Sega re-acquired the rights themselves and released a further streamlined redesign of the console during the launch of the Sega Genesis. The Master System was later released in Europe in September 1987, in South Korea in April 1989 and in Brazil in September 1989 where distribution rights were given to Tec Toy. A re-release of the console in the Japanese market under the new Master System brand and redesign also occurred in 1987.

This is a list of the  game titles for the Master System. 15 were released only in Japan, 4 were released only in North America, 158 were released only in PAL regions and 22 were released only in Brazil. It is organized alphabetically. See Lists of video games for related lists.

Games

Sega Card games

Compilations

Unlicensed games

Homebrew games

References

 
Sega Master System
Master system